The 1963 Giro d'Italia was the 46th running of the Giro d'Italia, one of cycling's Grand Tour races. The Giro started in Naples, on 19 May, with a  stage and concluded back in Milan, on 9 June, with a  leg. A total of 120 riders from 12 teams entered the 21-stage race, which was won by Italian Franco Balmamion of the Carpano team. The second and third places were taken by Italian riders Vittorio Adorni and Giorgio Zancanaro, respectively.

Teams

Twelve teams were invited by the race organizers to participate in the 1963 edition of the Giro d'Italia. Each team sent a squad of ten riders, which meant that the race started with a peloton of 120 cyclists. From the riders that began the race, 86 made it to the finish in Milan.

The teams entering the race were:

Route and stages
The race route was revealed to the public on 25 March 1963 by race director Vincenzo Torriani.

Classification leadership

One jersey was worn during the 1963 Giro d'Italia. The leader of the general classification – calculated by adding the stage finish times of each rider – wore a pink jersey. This classification is the most important of the race, and its winner is considered as the winner of the Giro.

The mountains classification leader. The climbs were ranked in first and second categories. In this ranking, points were won by reaching the summit of a climb ahead of other cyclists. There were three categories of mountains. The first category awarded 50, 40, 30, 20, and 10 points, the second distributed 40, 30, 20, and 10 points, and the third category gave 30, 20, and 10 points. Although no jersey was awarded, there was also one classification for the teams, in which the teams were awarded points for their rider's performance during the stages.

Final standings

General classification

Mountains classification

Traguardi tricolori classification

Team classification

References

Citations

1963
Giro d'Italia
Giro d'Italia
Giro d'Italia
Giro d'Italia
1963 Super Prestige Pernod